Charles F. Hackmeyer (1903-1989) was a Mobile, Alabama-area community leader and politician who served two terms on the Mobile City Commission. He was also the city's 80th Mayor. His terms as Mayor of Mobile was when the title was co-extensive with the presidency of the City Commission. He was defeated for re-election in 1961 by challenger Charles S. Trimmier who would go would only serve one term, losing four years later to Lambert C. Mims.

References

World Statesmen list of Mayors of Mobile

Year of birth unknown
Mayors of Mobile, Alabama
1903 births
1989 deaths
20th-century American politicians